Yue Safy (born 8 November 2000) is a Cambodian footballer who plays for Phnom Penh Crown in the Cambodian League and the Cambodia U-23.

Club career
Yue Safy made his senior debut in Cambodia League on 16 March 2018 for Phnom Penh Crown.

International career
Yue Safy made his senior debut in 2020 AFC U-23 Championship qualification against Australia national under-23 soccer team on 22 March 2019.

International goals

Honours
Phnom Penh Crown
Cambodian Premier League: 2021, 2022
Cambodian Super Cup: 2022
Cambodian League Cup: 2022

External links 
Yue Safy at NationalFootballTeams

Living people
2000 births
Cambodian footballers
Cambodia international footballers
Cambodian Cham people
Cambodian Muslims
People from Kandal province
Association football defenders
Competitors at the 2019 Southeast Asian Games
Phnom Penh Crown FC players
Competitors at the 2021 Southeast Asian Games
Southeast Asian Games competitors for Cambodia